Codrin Ștefan Țapu (born 17 December 1973) is a Romanian author and psychologist who wrote on the hypostases of personality.

Life and career
Țapu was born in Bucharest, and attended the University of Bucharest, where he earned his bachelor's, master's, and doctoral degrees in psychology. From 1998, he worked as an instructor at the psychology department of Hyperion University. In 2000, he was awarded there the chair of lecturer extraordinary. In 2006, he was appointed an associate professor of psychology at the University of Agronomic Sciences and Veterinary Medicine, being the first chair of the postgraduate module of counseling.

Work
Țapu's work addresses the multidimensionality of the self and the integrative study of a person. By integrating spirituality with materialism, he proposed a perspective of interconnected spiritual support systems.

Țapu summarized the hypostatic approach to personality in his 2001 book. The hypostatic model, originated in mathematical logic by Charles Sanders Peirce with his "hypostatic abstraction", argues, in Țapu's view, that the person presents herself in a multitude of different aspects or hypostases, depending on the internal and external realities she relates to, including different epistemological approaches to the study of personality.

The hypostatic model describes personality and self as well as interpersonal relationships, with implications in dating. Personality is viewed as both an agency and a relatively stable construction, as the model is accompanied with specific methods of assessment, counseling, and psychotherapy addressing each of the personality dimensions. The model was listed also as a resource on counselor's qualities in life quality management.

As part of the efforts of revival and development of psychology in post-communist Romania, Tapu published a dictionary of psychopathology, and a textbook of humanistic systems psychology.

The work of Țapu has been described as inaugurating the field of concrete systems or "hypostatic" psychology, and opening new insights into integrative, synthetic and holistic studies of individual personality factors within a person. Also, his work has been criticized for containing a large number of neologisms that make it difficult to understand, and for being "doomed to be incomplete".

In his spiritual materialist writings, Țapu proposes a universal view of deity that even encompasses atheism, addressing controversial matters like guilt and euthanasia in short texts that read like poetry, and providing a provocative lifestyle perspective for people of all backgrounds. Reviewers compared the aphoristic style of Tapu to that of the ancient sacred texts, Jesus, Gandhi, the Sufi mystics, Jodorowsky, and Chopra.

Țapu was featured in the Anthology of Contemporary Romanian Aphorism (2017).

Awards
In 2022, Țapu won first prize at the International Aphorism Festival in Tecuci.

Bibliography

References

External links
Codrin Țapu at Citatepedia.com

Romanian psychologists
Romanian essayists
Romanian self-help writers
1973 births
Living people
Academic staff of the University of Agronomic Sciences and Veterinary Medicine of Bucharest
University of Bucharest alumni